James David Smillie (January 16, 1833 – September 15, 1909) was an American artist.

Biography

James David Smillie was born in New York City on January 16, 1833.

His father, James Smillie (1807–1885), a Scottish engraver, emigrated to New York in 1829, was elected to the National Academy of Design in 1851, did much, with his brother William Cumming (1813–1908), to develop the engraving of bank-notes, and was an excellent landscape-engraver.

The son studied with him and in the National Academy of Design; engraved on steel vignettes for bank-notes and some illustrations, notably F. O. C. Darley's pictures for James Fenimore Cooper's novels; was elected an associate of the National Academy in 1865—the year after he first began painting—and an academician in 1876; and was a founder (1866) of the American Water Color Society, of which he was treasurer in 1866–73 and president in 1873–78, and of the New York Etching Club.

He married Anna C. Cook in 1881.

Among his paintings, in oils, are Evening among the Sierras (1876) and The Cliffs of Normandy (1885), and in water colour, A Scrub Race (1876) and The Passing Herd (1888). He wrote and illustrated the article on the Yosemite in Picturesque America. A portrait of Smillie by Henry Augustus Loop is in the collection of the National Academy of Design, as is another by James Hamilton Shegogue.

His brother, George Henry Smillie, was also a painter.

James David Smillie died at his home in New York on September 15, 1909.

References

External links
 James D. Smillie Papers at the National Gallery of Canada, Ottawa, Ontario

1833 births
1909 deaths
19th-century American painters
19th-century American male artists
American male painters
20th-century American painters
American landscape painters
Painters from New York City
American people of Scottish descent
National Academy of Design alumni
National Academy of Design members
20th-century American male artists